Proseis, also known as Prosenses, was a town of ancient Arcadia, in the district of Parrhasia. The people of Proseis moved to Megalopolis upon the founding of that city in 371 BCE.

Its site is unlocated.

References

Populated places in ancient Arcadia
Former populated places in Greece
Lost ancient cities and towns
Parrhasia